The 1839 Connecticut gubernatorial election was held on April 1, 1839. Incumbent governor and Whig nominee William W. Ellsworth was re-elected, defeating former senator and Democratic nominee John M. Niles with 51.52% of the vote.

General election

Candidates
Major party candidates

William W. Ellsworth, Whig
John M. Niles, Democratic

Minor party candidates

Elisha Phelps, Conservative

Results

References

1839
Connecticut
Gubernatorial